The Beggar's Daughter is a 1950 Italian historical melodrama film directed by Carlo Campogalliani and starring Paola Barbara, Franca Maj and Steve Barclay. It is based on a novel of the same name by Carolina Invernizio.

Plot 
1860. In a villa in Naples, a foreign lady was killed: a poor beggar without one arm, Paolo, was accused of the crime, although innocent, he was sentenced to twenty years. The poor man's daughter, Anna, has worked in vain in favor of her father: she has only obtained the moral support of Franco, the son of the judge who sentenced Paolo. Franco, who is the leader of a group of patriots, partisans of Garibaldi, investigates the murder on his behalf and is induced to suspect his brother-in-law Giorgio, chief of police and the ex-maid of the murdered woman, who now is at Giorgio's service.

Meanwhile Anna, threatened by her stepmother, who tries to market the girl, saves herself with the help of another patriot. Franco entrusts Anna with the management of a flower shop, which serves as a meeting place for her friends. On the eve of the Garibaldi's entry into Naples, Giorgio has Franco arrested, who is then freed by the patriots. When the insurrection broke out, the doors of the prisons opened. Giorgio is killed by the maid, the only witness to his crime, whom he had arrested. Happy Anna and Franco go to free Paolo.

Cast
 Paola Barbara as Fanny, amante di Giorgio
 Franca Maj as Anna
 Steve Barclay as Franco
 Renato Valente as Giorgio
 Jole Fierro as Lelia
 Ave Ninchi as Marisa, la governante di Anna
 Domenico Serra
 Nico Pepe
 Amina Pirani Maggi
 Nino Marchesini
 Carlo Chiesini
 Franco Pesce
 Umberto Silvestri
 Alfredo Varelli
 Jody Desmond
 Ciro Berardi
 Gustavo Serena
 Piero Pastore
 Pina Gallini
 Franco Jamonte
 Attilio Torelli
 Mauro Serra
 Leopoldo Valentini
 Clara Auteri Pepe

References

Bibliography
 Goble, Alan. The Complete Index to Literary Sources in Film. Walter de Gruyter, 1999.

External links

1950 films
1950s historical drama films
Italian historical drama films
1950s Italian-language films
Films directed by Carlo Campogalliani
Films set in the 19th century
1950 drama films
Melodrama films
Italian black-and-white films
1950s Italian films